Casey Township is one of fifteen townships in Clark County, Illinois, USA.  As of the 2010 census, its population was 3,958 and it contained 1,857 housing units.  Casey Township changed its name from Cumberland in September 1876.

Geography

Cities, towns, villages
 Casey (vast majority)
 Martinsville (west edge)

Unincorporated towns
 Cumberland
(This list is based on USGS data and may include former settlements.)

Cemeteries
The township contains these five cemeteries: Blackburn, Casey City, Connelly, Cumberland Baptist and Washington.

Major highways
  Interstate 70
  U.S. Route 40
  Illinois Route 49

Airports and landing strips
 Casey Municipal Airport

Demographics

School districts
 Casey-Westfield Community Unit School District 4c
 Martinsville Community Unit School District 3c

Political districts
 Illinois' 15th congressional district
 State House District 109
 State Senate District 55

References
 
 United States Census Bureau 2007 TIGER/Line Shapefiles
 United States National Atlas

External links
 City-Data.com
 Illinois State Archives

Townships in Clark County, Illinois
Townships in Illinois